Garfield's Nightmare is a platform game released for the Nintendo DS, based on the popular cartoon strip Garfield. The game follows Garfield traveling through 16 levels trying to escape a nightmare that Garfield has, by dodging enemies and negotiating complex terrain. The levels are divided into four sections, with each section having its own theme and a boss battle at the end.

Plot
Garfield comes up with the idea to combine breakfast, lunch and dinner to have more time for his other activities. He crams a couple of pizzas, some lasagnas and two bags of jelly donuts into one big sandwich, which he eats. However, this proves to be too much even for him, and he slowly falls asleep and his nightmare begins.
 
Garfield suddenly wakes up in a haunted castle; rather than the real world, he has entered a strange dream world populated by the monsters of Garfield's sub-conscious. To make things even worse, Garfield smashed his alarm clock in the real world, and now his only chance at waking up soon depends on his ability to find the shattered pieces and put them back together.

Gameplay
Garfield's Nightmare is a 2D platform game. It does not make heavy use of the touch screen features of the Nintendo DS, instead using it to display game statistics. Each level has a bonus door, leading to a bonus game to collect extra lives, as well as a secret area in each level which contains an extra life.

Each level will lead Garfield to engage in a final battle that will transform his nightmare into a dream. Bosses need to be terminated during these timeless fights, gradually enhancing the difficulty level.

Amusement park ride
A ride that shared the game's name was created for Kennywood Park in 2004. The boat ride was originally called "The Old Mill", but was rebranded with a Garfield theme until 2020 when it was changed back to The Old Mill.

Reception

The game received "average" reviews according to the review aggregation website Metacritic.

References

External links
Official Website (US)

2007 video games
Platform games
Nintendo DS games
Nintendo DS-only games
Video games based on Garfield
Video games developed in Germany
Single-player video games
Video games about nightmares
The Game Factory games